Peter Tully (1947-1992), was a jeweller, designer and artistic director, notable for his influence on jewellery design in Australia through the utilisation of found and non-precious materials, as well as his artistic direction of the Sydney Mardi Gras (1982-1986).

Tully was born Peter Graig (a spelling mistake in the birth register) Tutungi in Carlton, Melbourne on 17 December 1947. At the age of five Tully's family moved to the beach resort of Lorne in Victoria. Of Arabic/Egyptian origin, his grandparents had migrated to Australia between the wars and anglicised their name to the more acceptable Tully. At the age of 16 Tully moved to Melbourne, first working as a clerk, but later moving into display, making props for Public Benefit Shoes, and later with a German display company. In 1969 Tully, accompanied by the fashion designer Linda Jackson and her partner, the photographer Fran Moore, went to live in Lae in Papua New Guinea. After a year living in Lae the three set out on the hippy trail to Europe, spending much of 1970 and 1971 traveling through South East Asia, including the Philippines, Indonesia, Bali, Thailand, Malaysia and Singapore. In 1971 Tully arrived in Paris, where he taught English, and undertook trips to the Netherlands and Spain. It was in Paris that Tully became particularly impressed by the collections of African and Oceanic art. In 1972 Tully met up with Linda and Fran in London, before he made his way back to Australia, via Egypt, Sudan, Ethiopia, Kenya and India. During this return trip he was particularly impressed by the use of leather and non-precious materials in jewellery in Sudan, and the sale by weight, rather than workmanship, of jewellery in Ethiopia. Meeting up again with Linda and Fran in Thailand, he returned to Melbourne in 1973.

In 1973 Tully met the artist and activist David McDiarmid, becoming lovers for the following two years, and remaining friends and collaborators till Tully’s death in 1992.

Tully and McDiarmid moved to Sydney in 1975, joining their Melbourne friend and creative collaborators Linda Jackson, who had moved there with her partner Fran Moore in 1973. This period also saw McDiarmid, Tully and Jackson collaborating with Melbourne fashion designer and retailer Clarence Chai and Sydney-based fashion designer and retailer Jenny Kee. After their move to Sydney with Tully and McDiarmid were soon involved with Kee’s fashion store Flamingo Park in Strand Arcade, hand-painting fabrics for Jackson’s dresses. His experience of traditional tribal cultures through many years of travel in New Guinea, Africa and India - along with the vibrant and creative urban sub-cultural 'tribes' he saw New York - stimulated the development of his 'urban tribalwear'.

In 1977 Tully held his second one-man exhibition, exhibiting his Australiana-themed jewellery at Paraphethana Gallery.

Tully was undoubtedly the most influential designer involved with the Sydney Gay and Lesbian Mardi Gras, through his role as artistic director from 1982-1986 and through the establishment and management of the Workshop. It was in these roles that Tully greatly contributed to the transformation of the Mardi Gras from a political march to cultural event.

He once said of the legendary Paradise Garage disco in New York: 'It was about 85% black and very exciting. They played the best music I'd never heard and the people dressed. Even though they didn't dress expensively, they had lots of style. They could wear a paper bag and look like a million dollars. And they really impressed me. So that was the impetus to get into costume.'

Peter Tully died in Paris in August 1992 from an AIDS-related illness, he was 45.

Solo exhibitions
 "Passion for Plastics"  Peter Tully  at   Aces Art  Shop  144 Edgecliff Road Woollahra NSW  opened 12 December  1976
 "Passion for Plastics" Peter Tully  at Paraphernalia Gallery Melbourne , opened 24 April 1977 -see citation above to  Pat von Wolff fashion editor of The Age  in her article of 25 April 1977 called  Plastic Fashion
 "Living  Plastics"  Jewellery by Peter Tully (and  An Australian Dream Lounge by David McDiarmid )  Hogarth Galleries  Paddington  NSW   6–24 December 1977
 "New Works "   by Peter Tully and David McDiarmid   Hogarth Galleries Paddington NSW   11 November  -1 December   1978
 "Urban Tribalwear"  by Peter Tully  Crafts Council of  Australia   113 George St Sydney  22 November  to 22 December 1980
 "Florescents "  by Peter Tully   Hieroglyphics Gallery 135 crown St East Sydney  3–17 December 1981
 "Solo Survey" Queen Victoria Museum and Art Gallery , Launceston , Tasmania.  1982 ( See solo survey linkage project Tasmanian School of Art UTAS )
 "Primitive Futures" by Peter Tully   ( with David McDiarmid  " New Work " )  Roslyn Oxley9 Gallery  20 May -16 June 1984
 "Treasures of the Last Future"  Barry Stern Galleries  Paddington NSW  1–23 December 1990
 "Urban Tribalwear and Beyond"   Peter Tully retrospective for the Australian National Gallery (now National Gallery of Australia)  in Canberra at the Drill Hall Gallery. Curated by John McPhee   6 July - 22 September 1991.  The first retrospective  by  a living artistthat the then ANG now NGA  ever  did.

Group exhibitions
 "An Exhibition of work by Homosexual and Lesbian Artists"  23–24 July 1978 , Watters Gallery, Sydney. The exhibition included a fundraiser  for the 4th National Homosexual Conference to be held in August 1978 at Paddington Town Hall, Sydney NSW. Other artists included  David McDiarmid, Vivienne Binns, Frances Budden , Sally Colechin, Doug Erskine, Bill Morley and Robert Lawrie.

 "Art Clothes "  Art Gallery  of NSW   ( AGNSW )  20 December 1980 – 1 February 1981

 "Gay Mardi Gras  Exhibition 1985 "   Print Source Gallery  Oxford St  Darlinghurst  NSW  February -March 1985

 "Nine Artists "  Barry Stern Gallery  Glenmore Rd Paddington NSW 15 February-19 March 1992  ( for Sydney  Gay and Lesbian Mardi Gras )

 "You Are Here "  Martin Browne Fine Art  11 gay male artists for  Sydney Gay and Lesbian Mardi Gras Festival   6–28 February 1993  Curated by Scott Redford and Luke Roberts.  Previously  shown at Institute of Modern Art  (IMA) in Brisbane in November 1992. Artists  were Peter Tully, David McDiarmid, Luke Roberts , Scott Redford, Leonard Brown , Peter Cooley, Brent Harris ,Ross Wallace , Hiram To, Matthew Jones and Bashir Baraki.

 "From Eltham to Memphis"  Craft Victoria Gallery Melbourne VIC , 7 September 2000 to 14 October 2000.

 Dead Gay Artists, Tin Sheds Gallery, 1–23 February 2002 Curator Robert Lake.

 Sydney Gay Mardi Gras Museum Exhibition   to celebrate 35 years of the Sydney Gay and Lesbian Mardi Gras , drawing on the extensive holdings of the Australian Lesbian and Gay Archives (ALGA).  At 94 Oxford St Darlinghurst NSW 2010  from  29 January 2013 to ?.February 2013.

 Mix Tape 1980s: Appropriation, Subculture, Critical Style, National Gallery of Victoria, 11 April–1 September 2013

Collections

Peter Tully’s work is held in numerous collections, including:

 Australian Queer Archives, including personal papers, jewellery, designs, photographs, posters etc.
 Art Gallery of New South Wales
 National Gallery of Australia
 National Gallery of Victoria
 Hamilton Gallery, Victoria
 Newcastle Art  Gallery  ( Newcastle Regional Art Gallery )
 Powerhouse Museum , Sydney
 National Museum of Australia , Canberra
 State Library of Queensland  , Brisbane
The Museum of Fine Arts, Houston

References

Further reading 
Adamson, Glenn, and Jane Pavitt. Postmodernism: Style and Subversion, 1970-1990. London: V & A, 2011.

Gray, Sally. Friends, Fashion & Fabulousness: The Making of an Australian Style. , 2017.

1947 births
1992 deaths
Australian LGBT painters
Australian LGBT rights activists
Australian gay artists
20th-century Australian painters
20th-century Australian male artists
Australian male painters
Gay painters
20th-century Australian LGBT people
Australian people of Arab descent
Artists from Melbourne
AIDS-related deaths in France